KAD Movies is a premium Telugu films production and distribution company, it is the first to go ahead and release Telugu films in African countries.

It has distributed more than 50 Telugu films worldwide and released about 500 films on DVD making it the largest reaching Telugu DVD label.

KAD Entertainment had acquired brands such as SPV and Idream to expand its reach on DVD.

Distributor - filmography 

 Maska (2009) ... Distributor (2009) (worldwide)
 Parugu (2008) ... Distributor (2008) (theatrical)
 Don (2007 film) (2007) ... Distributor (2007) (USA)
 Chandamama (2007) ... Distributor (2007) (DVD)
 Classmates (2007 film) (2007) ... Distributor (2007) (USA) (theatrical)
 Sainikudu (2006) ... Distributor (2006) (USA) (theatrical)
 Stalin (2006 film) (2006) ... Distributor (2006) (USA) (theatrical)
 Ashok (film) (2006) ... Distributor (2006) (USA) (DVD), Distributor (2006) (USA) (theatrical)
 Godavari (film) (2006) ... Distributor (2006) (USA) (DVD)
 Pournami (2006) ... Distributor (2006) (USA) (DVD), Distributor (2006) (USA) (theatrical)
 Devadasu (2006) ... Distributor (2006) (USA) (DVD)
 Jai Chiranjeeva (2005) ... Distributor (2005) (USA) (theatrical), Distributor (2006) (USA) (DVD)
 Vennela (2005) ... Distributor (2006) (worldwide) (DVD)
 Andhrudu (2005) ... Distributor (2005) (USA) (DVD)
 Super (2005 film) (2005) ... Distributor (2005) (USA) (DVD)
 Subash Chandra Bose (film) (2005) ... Distributor (2005) (USA) (DVD)
 Chakram (2005) ... Distributor (2005) (USA) (DVD)
 Mass (film) (2004) ... Distributor (2004) (USA) (DVD)
 Anand (2004 film) (2004) ... Distributor (2005) (USA) (DVD)
 Ela Cheppanu (2003) ... Distributor (2003) (worldwide) (DVD) (except India)
 Aadi (2002) ... Distributor (2002) (USA) (DVD)
 Kalusukovalani (2002) ... Distributor (2002) (USA) (DVD)
 Gitanjali (1989) ... Distributor (1989) (worldwide) (DVD) (Non-India)
 Tagore (film)(2003) ... DVD, Audio Release (USA release)
 Velugu Needalu (1961) ... VCD Release
 Kalasi Vunte Kaladu Sukham (1961) ...
 Johnny
 Gudumba Shankar
 Nuvve Nuvve
 Nuvvu Naaku Nachav
 Adavi Ramudu
 Chatrapathi (film)
 Jai Chiranjeeva
 Sri Manjunatha

Production company - filmography 

 Stalin (2006) ... Production Company

References 

Film production companies based in Hyderabad, India
2000 establishments in Andhra Pradesh
Indian companies established in 2000